This is a list of seasons completed by the Dartmouth Big Green football team of the National Collegiate Athletic Association (NCAA) Division I Football Championship Subdivision (FCS). Since the team's creation in 1881, the Big Green have participated in more than 1,200 officially sanctioned games, holding an all-time record of 715–458–46. Dartmouth originally competed as a football independent but had stints in the Eastern Intercollegiate Football Association and its successor conference, the Triangular Football League. After spending the first half of the 20th century as an independent school, Dartmouth joined the Ivy League as a founding member in 1956.

Seasons

See also 

 List of Ivy League football standings
 List of Triangular Football League standings

References

Dartmouth

Dartmouth Big Green football seasons